Taylor v Connex South Eastern Ltd (5.7.2000) Appeal No: EAT/1243/99, is a UK labour law case, concerning the TUPE Regulations.

Facts
Mr Taylor was a chartered accountant, employed as an administrator by the SouthEastern Train Company, a division of British Rail. It was privatised and sold to Connex South Eastern in 1996. In 1997 he got a new job as Deputy Company Secretary, but on his new contract he made amendments, amounting to a counter offer in contract, therefore, according to the EAT, remaining employed under the terms of his old agreement. In 1998 he was given, according to ongoing changes throughout the company, another new contract, which contained clauses that were to his detriment (he lost some holiday and redundancy entitlement). He complained, but the company would not budge. They insisted he accept the terms or have three weeks notice.

The tribunal found that he was redundant, but that he was dismissed not for this but for 'some other substantial reason' under s 98 of the Employment Rights Act 1996. He therefore lost his claim for unfair dismissal. He appealed.

Judgment
The Employment Appeal Tribunal (Judge Wilkie QC, Ms J Drake and Mr K M Young CBE) held that under r 8(1) (now r 7) of the Transfer of Undertakings (Protection of Employment) Regulations Mr Taylor was actually dismissed in connection with the transfer of the railway from public to private hands. This was so despite the fact that privatisation took place 2 years beforehand.

See also
UK labour law

Notes

Employment Appeal Tribunal cases
2000 in case law
2000 in British law